, commonly referred to as The King Kong Show, is an anime-influenced series produced by Videocraft International and Toei Animation. ABC ran the series in the United States on Saturday mornings between September 10, 1966, and August 31, 1969. It is the first anime series produced in Japan for an American company (not counting Rankin/Bass' previous Animagic stop motion productions, which were also animated in Japan). 

This series is an animated adaptation of the famous film monster King Kong with character designs by Jack Davis and Rod Willis. In this series, the giant ape befriends the Bond family, with whom he goes on various adventures, fighting monsters, robots, aliens, mad scientists and other threats. Unlike King Kong's destructive roles in his films, the cartoon turned him into a protector of humanity.

The pair are sent out in a variety of miniature vehicles by their bad-tempered boss Chief Homer J. Chief to foil the fiendish plots of M.A.D. (Maladjusted, Anti-social and Darn mean), an evil organization made up of black-hatted and black-cloaked scientists "bent on destroying the world for their own gains".

In Japan, the first two episodes were combined into a 56-minute special, titled , and was broadcast on NET (now TV Asahi) on December 31, 1966.

This series was successful enough for Rankin/Bass to extend the Kong franchise to another Japanese company, Toho (which had already produced the hit film King Kong vs. Godzilla in 1962). This resulted in two films: Ebirah, Horror of the Deep (originally intended to be a Kong film) and King Kong Escapes, which was based on The King Kong Show.

On November 15, 2005, Sony Wonder released the first eight episodes (two King Kong cartoons separated by a Tom of T.H.U.M.B. cartoon) on two DVD releases titled King Kong: The Animated Series Volume 1 and King Kong: The Animated Series Volume 2. The pilot episode was included, in its two parts for American syndication, between the two DVDs.

Characters

 King Kong - The title character. The Eighth Wonder of the World, Kong was discovered on Mondo Island (sometimes known as Skull Island) by Bobby Bond, whom he saved from being eaten by a Tyrannosaurus rex. He has also saved Bobby and his family from other disasters afterward. Ever since he has become the family's mascot and a hero.
 Professor Carl Bond - The head/father of the Bond family. He is the basis for Rhodes Reason character Commander Carl Nelson in King Kong Escapes.
 Susan Bond - The teenage daughter. She is always somewhat perplexed by Bobby and Kong's friendship. She is the basis for Susan Watson (Linda Miller) in King Kong Escapes. Susan is always the one that knows what Dr. Who is up to and her fear is dreaming about snakes.
 Bobby Bond - The young son and Kong's closest companion. Saved by Kong from being eaten by a Tyrannosaurus rex, and they have been friends ever since. He is the basis for (Carl Craig) in Gamera vs. Viras.
 Captain Englehorn - A friend to the family and Professor Bond's ship captain. Based on the character from the original King Kong film.
 Dr. Who - The popular recurring villain. A bald, big-headed, and bespectacled mad scientist who wants to capture Kong and use him for his own evil schemes. He has no relation to the character from the British sci-fi TV series. He is the basis for Hideyo Amamoto's character Dr. Hu in King Kong Escapes.
 Mechani-Kong - Kong's robot double, invented by Dr. Who, who operates it via a control room in the robot's head. Neither the Bonds nor Captain Englehorn ever knows (or even figure out) that Dr. Who invented it, however. It appears in two King Kong segments, "MechaniKong" (the second King Kong segment from Episode 10) and "Anchors Away" (the second King Kong segment from Episode 25). Each segment features a different version of the robot. It is also Kong's nemesis in King Kong Escapes.

Cast
 Billie Mae Richards - Bobby Bond
 Carl Banas - Professor Bond
 Susan Conway - Susan Bond
 John Drainie 
 Alfie Scopp - Captain Englehorn 
 Paul Soles - Dr. Who

Crew
 Producer - William J. Keenan
 Executive Producers - Arthur Rankin Jr., Jules Bass
 Associate Producer - Larry Roemer
 Music/Lyrics - Maury Laws, Jules Bass
 Recording Supervisor - Bernard Cowan
 Sound/Effects - Bill Giles, Stephen Frohock, Bill Dowding, Frederick Tudor
 Animation Production - Toei Studios
 Character Designs - Jack Davis, Rod Willis
 Animation Continuity - Don Duga
 Story Editor - Cherney Berg

List of episodes 

 "King Kong" (December 31, 1966; 56-minute long pilot episode). In American syndication, the episode was split into two parts, which were titled "A Friend in Need" and "The Key to the City".The following episode list describes the show as it originally aired from April 5 to October 4, 1967, with each episode beginning with a six-minute King Kong segment, followed by a six-minute Tom of T.H.U.M.B. segment, then followed by a second six-minute King Kong segment.
 "Under the Volcano"/"For the Last Time, Feller...I'm Not Bait!"/"The Treasure Trap"
 "The Horror of Mondo Island"/"Hey, That Was A Close One World!"/"Dr. Who"
 "Rocket Island"/"I Was A 9 oz. Weakling 'Till One Day..."/"The African Bees"
 "The Hunter"/"I Was A Starling for the USA!"/"The Space Men"
 "The Jinx of the Sphinx"/"Cool Nerves and...Steady Hands"/"The Greeneyed Monster"
 "The Top of the World"/"All Guys from Outer Space are Creeps"/"The Golden Temple"
 "The Electric Circle"/"Mechanical Granma"/"Mirror of Destruction"
 "Tiger Tiger"/"The Day We Almost Had It"/"The Vise of Dr. Who"
 "King Kong's House"/"Tom Makes History"/"MechaniKong"
 "The Giant Sloths"/"Tom Scores Again"/"The Legend of Loch Ness"
 "Dr. Bone"/"Blow, Jack, Blow!"/"No Man's Snowman"
 "The Desert Pirates"/"Tom and the TV Pirates"/"Command Performance"
 "The Sea Surrounds Us"/"The Girl from M.A.D."/"Show Biz"
 "The Wizard of Overlord"/"Just One of Those Nights"/"Perilous Porpoise"
 "The Trojan Horse"/"Runt of 1,000 Faces"/"The Man from K.O.N.G."
 "Caribbean Cruise"/"Hello, Dollies!"/"Diver's Dilemma"
 "The Great Sun Spots"/"Pardner"/"Kong is Missing"
 "In the Land of the Giant Trees"/"Beans is Beans"/"Captain Kong"
 "Statue of Liberty Play"/"What Goes Up..."/"Pandora's Box"
 "Thousand Year Knockout"/"Our Man, the Monster"/"Desert City"
 "Eagle Squadron"/"Never Trust A Clam"/"The Kong of Stone"
 "Murderer's Maze"/"Drop that Ocean, Feller"/"The Great Gold Strike"
 "It Wasn't There Again Today"/"Plug that Leak"/"The Mad Whale"
 "King Kong Diamond"/"The Scooby"/"Anchors Away"

Music
The theme music for the series was recorded in London, England, in 1965, using primarily British studio musicians. Canadian conductor, vocalist and former Kitchener-Waterloo Record entertainment columnist Harry Currie provided vocal talent on the recording.

Reception
In the 2007 book Comics Gone Ape! The Missing Link to Primates in Comics, comics historian Michael Eury writes, "The Rankin/Bass King Kong was an early case of identity theft, where the Kong name was appropriated (fully under license) to describe a new character that, at best, only remotely resembled his namesake. This was Kong done wrong."

References

External links
 The King Kong Show overview—an in-depth Japanese website about the series
 Sekai no Ôja · King Kong Daikai in Animemorial (the Japanese name of the pilot episode)
 King Kong · 001 / 7 Oyayubi Tom in Animemorial (contains Japanese episode list, cast and staff)
 —an in-depth article about the series, featuring rare shots of various merchandise and tie-ins related to the series (French website)
 —an in-depth article about the series
 
 
 
 allcinema キングコング

King Kong (franchise)
1966 anime television series debuts
1966 American television series debuts
1969 American television series endings
1960s American animated television series
Action anime and manga
American Broadcasting Company original programming
American children's animated action television series
American children's animated adventure television series
American children's animated science fantasy television series
Japanese children's animated action television series
Japanese children's animated adventure television series
Japanese children's animated science fantasy television series
American prequel television series
Fantasy anime and manga
Animated television shows based on films
Rankin/Bass Productions television series
Anime-influenced Western animated television series
Animated television series about apes